The W350 Project is a proposed wooden skyscraper in central Tokyo, Japan, announced in 2018. The skyscraper is set to reach a height of 350 meters with 70 floors, which upon its completion will make it the tallest wooden skyscraper, as well as Japan's highest, over all, skyscraper. The skyscraper is set to be a mixed-used building including residential, office and retail space.

Description
It is supposed to be made of 90% wood and the rest being steel, steel braces will be used to enhance resistance to wind and earthquakes due to the area's high seismic activity. Wood was chosen since timber-based structures have proven to be very resistant to earthquakes. The project requires 185,000 cubic meters of timber (or 6.5 million cubic feet), and plans to revitalize forestry and timber demand in Japan. The choice of wood, aside from its aesthetics, is part of a larger movement aiming to "change cities into forests". Wooden structures are also easier to rebuild or replace than concrete structures if it collapses. Two-thirds of Japan is covered by forest, making it the 2nd most tree-covered country of the OECD countries after Finland. Most of Japan's cedars and cypresses were planted after the Second World War and are now reaching maturity.

The skyscraper is designed by the architectural firm Nikken Sekkei, and build by the developer Sumitomo Forestry.

Its construction is estimated to cost USD 5.6 billion.

See also
List of tallest wooden buildings
Brock Commons Tallwood House
List of tallest buildings in the world
Plyscraper

References

External links

Changing Cities into Forests: Creating Environmentally-Friendly and Timber-Utilizing Cities - New Development Concept W350 Plan for Wooden High-Rise Building, Sfc.com

Skyscrapers in Tokyo
Wooden architecture
Plyscraper
Proposed skyscrapers in Japan